The Telejogo II is a dedicated first-generation home video game console that was manufactured by Philco and Ford and released in 1979 in Brazil as the successor to the 1977 video game console Telejogo.

In contrast to the predecessor, the paddles are no longer attached to the housing of the console itself, but are removable.

Games 
Due to the integrated AY-3-8610 chipset, the system is able to play the following ten games:

 Hockey
 Tênis
 Paredão I
 Paredão II
 Basquete I
 Basquete II
 Futebol
 Barreira
 Tiro Alvo I
 Tiro Alvo II

External links 
Telejogo II on MobyGames
Telejogo II on bojoga.com (in Portuguese)

References 

Dedicated consoles
First-generation video game consoles
Home video game consoles
1970s toys